Gomaespuma was a Spanish radio show, hosted for 15 years by Juan Luis Cano and Guillermo Fesser.  The program was cast through the years in several nationwide networks of Spain. It began in Antena 3 Radio in May 1992. It became one of the most popular morning shows in the 90's on M-80 Radio and it saw the last days in Onda Cero Radio in July 2007, when the last program was broadcast.

Gomaespuma organises the "Flamenco pa tos" festival, the most important Flamenco festival in Spain and also directs a foundation of the same name.  The festival's proceeds help children in need in Managua.

Presenters 
 Pay attention to the pedals: Luis Montoro
 Cinema:             Cándida Villar
 Corresponsal en Paris:   Rubén Amón
 Corresponsal USA:       Gina Fox
 Mister García:               Claro García
 Interviews:                  Juan Luis y Guillermo
 "Flamenco pa' tos":          José Manuel Gamboa y Juan Verdú
 The guide of the "Michelines": Juan Carlos Orlando
 The B face:                  Carlos Cano
 The musical "croqueta":      Santi Alcanda
 The woman that I love:       Curra Fernández
 Books:                       Mar de Tejeda
 News:                        Esmeralda Velasco
 Gomaespuma with:             José Manuel Lapeña
 Gomaespumino:                Juan Luis and Guillermo
 Health for the biggest:      Alfonso del Álamo

Other Shows 
 Cooking with Josechu Letón
 Gomaespuma of Success
 Military Gomaespuma
 Regional Gomaespuma
 "Supernotición que te cagas"

Characters 
These characters appeared on television and radio (marionettes). Most of these names contain puns, e.g. "Chema Pamundi" ("Chema" is colloquial for name "José María") sounds like "mapamundi" ("World map").

 Armando Adistancia
 Borja Món de York
 Candida
 Chema Pamundi
 Don Eusebio
 Don Francisco Rupto
 Don Gun
 Don Jesús Tituto
 El niño del paquete
 Estela Gartija
 Gustavo de Básica
 Padre Palomino
 Peláez

Books 
 20 Years With Gomaespuma
 There is Not More Family Than One Family
 Great Misfortunes of the History of Spain
 The Father Says No
 The "Michelines" guide
 When God Presses, He Drowns a Lot  (Guillermo Fesser)
 Hincaíto (Juan Luis Cano)
 The Legs are Not of the Body (Juan Luis Cano)
 Trades Guide of Gomaespuma (Guillermo Fesser, Juan Luis Cano and Jose Manuel Lapeña)
 A Bullfighter's Pass (Juan Luis Cano y Ruben Amón)

External links 
These links are in Spanish
Web of Gomaespuma
Web of Onda Cero
Web of the Gomaespuma Foundation
History of Gomaespuma )
Videos Gomaespuma

Notes 

Spanish radio programs